Courtois is an unincorporated community in southwestern Washington County, Missouri, United States, within the Courtois Hills region. Courtois is located on Missouri Route C and at the confluence of Indian Creek and Courtois Creek.

The community is named after an unidentified settler, as is a nearby stream, Courtois Creek. According to Ramsay, "The name of the creek is locally pronounced and sometimes written as Coataway or Cotoway." The name of the town is locally pronounced "Cur-toys".

A post office was established in 1886, but is now closed and mail is now transported from Steelville or Belgrade.

References

Unincorporated communities in Washington County, Missouri
Unincorporated communities in Missouri